Piotr Gadzinowski (born 16 May 1957 in Częstochowa) is a Polish leftist politician. He was elected to Sejm three times, he was a member of Sejm 2001-2005, Sejm 2005-2007 and Sejm 2007-2011. He also declared he was planning to start in the upcoming election.

See also
Members of Polish Sejm 1997-2001
Members of Polish Sejm 2001-2005
Members of Polish Sejm 2005-2007

References

External links
Piotr Gadzinowski - parliamentary page - includes declarations of interest, voting record, and transcripts of speeches.

1957 births
Living people
People from Częstochowa
Polish United Workers' Party members
Democratic Left Alliance politicians
Members of the Polish Sejm 2001–2005
Members of the Polish Sejm 2005–2007
Members of the Polish Sejm 2007–2011
Democratic Left Alliance MEPs
MEPs for Poland 2004